The Minnesota Mullets are a Tier III junior ice hockey team located in Minneapolis, Minnesota. The Mullets play in the United States Premier Hockey League (USPHL) Premier Division. From 1993 to 2015, the team played in the former Minnesota Junior Hockey League (MnJHL). For most of the franchise's existence, it was known as the Lakers and played in various cities in the Minneapolis-Saint Paul area.

History 
Formed by Ralph Hayne in 1993 as the East Metro Lakers, the team called Aldrich Arena in White Bear Lake home until 2000. Under the guidance of coach Mike LaValle, the Lakers won the USA Hockey Junior B National Tournament in 1999.

The team renamed St. Paul Lakers and moved to Highland Arena for one season before relocating to Veterans Memorial Community Center in Inver Grove Heights. In 2009, it was renamed Edina Lakers when the club called Minnesota Made Ice Center. In 2014, the team relocated again to Forest Lake and became the Forest Lake Lakers.

In 2015, the Minnesota Junior Hockey League was merged into the United States Premier Hockey League as part of the Midwest Division, a new Tier III league within the USPHL. However, the Midwest did not have its own league playoff championships, but instead the top teams from the Midwest Division played the top teams from the USP3 Division for a single championship. The Lakers won their conference semifinals, qualifying for the USPHL USP3/Midwest playoffs but failed to move on past the round robin stage. In 2016, the Midwest Division was split up among the USPHL Elite and USP3 Divisions with the Forest Lake Lakers going to the Elite Division. In April 2016, Kasey Yoder replaced Dennis Canfield as head coach and general manager.

On September 9, 2016, Hayne sold the franchise to Chris Walby. Walby then took over as head coach and general manager from the recently promoted Yoder. He then led the Lakers to a 23–17–4 record and a home playoff spot in the first round. At the conclusion of the 2016–17 season, Walby renamed the franchise to the Minnesota Mullets while remaining in Forest Lake. The Mullets also became a player development affiliate of the Jersey Hitmen of the National Collegiate Development Conference, a new higher-level league run by the USPHL for the 2017–18 season. In 2019, the team moved to Northeast Ice Arena in Minneapolis.

Season-by-season records

Notable alumni
The Lakers have produced a number of alumni playing in higher levels of junior hockey, NCAA Division I and Division III, and ACHA college programs, and professional hockey.

Matiss Kivlenieks: Lakers in 2013–14 and 2014–15; played for the Columbus Blue Jackets (2019–20)
Joel Rechlicz: Lakers in 2003–04; played 23 games for the New York Islanders (2008–2010) and three games for Washington Capitals (2011–12)

Coaches

References

External links
 Mullets website

Sports in Minneapolis–Saint Paul
Ice hockey teams in Minnesota
Ice hockey clubs established in 1993
1993 establishments in Minnesota